Roger Gaillard (Port-au-Prince, 10 April 1923 – 2000) was a Haitian historian and novelist. Born in Port-au-Prince, Gaillard earned a philosophy degree at the University of Paris in France. He is best known for his multiple-volume chronicle of the United States' occupation of Haiti.

Selected works
 L'Univers Romanesque de Jacques Roumain (1965)
 La Destinée de Carl Brouard (1966)
 Les Cent Jours de Rosalvo Bobo (1973)
 Charlemagne Péralte le Caco (1982)
 La Guérilla de Batraville (1983)
 La Déroute de l'Intelligence (1992)

References
 

1923 births
2000 deaths
20th-century Haitian historians
Haitian male novelists
People from Port-au-Prince
20th-century Haitian novelists
20th-century male writers
Haitian expatriates in France